Uburu Ekwe is an autonomous community in Ekwe Community in Isu Local Government Area of Imo State, Nigeria. It comprises four main villages and several kindreds and clans. The villages that make up Uburu Ekwe are Umuduruehie, Umuokwara, Eziekwe and Odicheku. The headquarters of Uburu Ekwe is located at Eziekwe.

Location and Geography 
Uburu Ekwe is located in the northern part of Ekwe in southern part of Isu Local Government Area of Imo State. Uburu Ekwe is bounded to the East by Isu Njaba, to the South by Ekwe Nwe Orie, to the West by Ebenator and to the North by Okwudor.

Notable people
 Apollos Okwuchi Nwauwa - Director, Africana Studies Program, Bowling Green State University, Ohio, USA

Populated places in Imo State
Villages in Igboland
Communities in Igboland